General elections were held in the Netherlands on 12 March 1959. The Catholic People's Party emerged as the largest party, winning 49 of the 150 seats in the House of Representatives.

Results

References

General elections in the Netherlands
1959 elections in the Netherlands
Netherlands